Symons Valley Road is a major arterial road and rural highway that links Calgary from Stoney Trail (Highway 201) to Madden in Alberta, Canada. It is preceded by Beddington Trail, a major expressway along West Nose Creek linking Deerfoot Trail to Stoney Trail within Calgary, and is succeeded by Range Road 30. The portion of Symons Valley Road within Rocky View County from the Calgary city limit to Highway 574 south of Madden is designated as Alberta Provincial Highway No. 772.

Route description 
Beddington Trail, which precedes Symons Valley Road, travels in a northwest direction from Deerfoot Trail forming the boundary between the communities of Beddington Heights and Sandstone Valley to the southwest and Aurora Business Park and Country Hills to the northeast. Prior to intersecting with Stoney Trail and continuing as Symons Valley Road, Beddington Trail bisects the community of Hidden Valley.

Within Calgary, Symons Valley Road from Stoney Trail to the city limit, just south of Township Road 261, forms the boundary between the communities of Kincora and Evanston before bisecting the community of Sage Hill. In addition to being a numbered highway, Rocky View County has named the entirety of Highway 772, as well as the following  of Highway 574, as Symons Valley Road. Symons Valley Road is signed as Highway 772 from 144 Avenue, but does not officially start until just south of Township Road 261.

Major intersections

See also 

Transportation in Calgary

References 

Roads in Calgary
772